Xavier Accart (born 1971) is an historian of ideas, specializing in René Guénon. His field of research lies at the crossroads of the history of spirituality, anthropology of religion and literary creation.

Biography
Having graduated from the Institut d'études politiques d'Aix-en-Provence, he earned a doctorate from the section of religious sciences at the École pratique des hautes études. His dissertation was published under the title Guénon ou le renversement des clartés : influence d'un métaphysicien sur la vie littéraire et intellectuelle française, 1920-1970 (Paris, Édidit, 2005).  By the same publisher he directed, with the collaboration of Daniel Lançon and Thierry Zarcone, L'Ermite de Duqqi : René Guénon en marge des milieux francophones égyptiens (Milan, Arché, 2001).

He is the grandson of Jean Accart

Publications 

With Daniel Lançon and Thierry Zarcone, L'Ermite de Duqqi. René Guénon en marge des milieux francophones égyptiens, Milan, Éditions Archè, 2001. .
Guénon ou le renversement des clartés. Influence d'un métaphysicien sur la vie littéraire et intellectuelle française (1920-1970), préface d'Antoine Compagnon, Edidit, 2006.
Contribution à Jean-Pierre Brach et Jérôme Rousse-Lacordaire (dir.), Études d'histoire de l'ésotérisme, Paris, Éditions du Cerf, 2007. 
Vivre et comprendre la liturgie, Presses de la Renaissance, 2009.

1971 births
21st-century French historians
Intellectual historians
Living people
Sciences Po Aix alumni
French male non-fiction writers
Place of birth missing (living people)